The Hintere Brandjochspitze is a summit roughly 200 metres northwest of the Vordere Brandjochspitze in the Nordkette range above Innsbruck. It rises above its "forward" neighbour by around 40 metres.

The summit may be reached in 20 minutes from the Vordere Brandjochspitze at climbing grade UIAA I through a gully left of the arête. A more difficult route runs along the western arête (grade III-) from the Hohe Warte. Other routes along the northern Hippengrat (UIAA IV) from the Hippenspitze (2,388 m) and from the northwest (UIAA IV) are rarely used.

Literature 
  (Hippengrat, northwest route)
  (normal route, west arête)

Two-thousanders of Austria
Karwendel
Mountains of Tyrol (state)
Mountains of the Alps
Innsbruck